Thomas Leo Clancy Jr. (April 12, 1947 – October 1, 2013) was an American novelist. He is best known for his technically detailed espionage and military-science storylines set during and after the Cold War. Seventeen of his novels have been bestsellers and more than 100 million copies of his books have been sold. His name was also used on movie scripts written by ghostwriters, nonfiction books on military subjects occasionally with co-authors, and video games. He was a part-owner of his hometown Major League Baseball team, the Baltimore Orioles of the American League, and vice-chairman of their community activities and public affairs committees.

Originally an insurance agent, his literary career began in 1984 when he sold his first military thriller novel The Hunt for Red October for $5,000 published by the small academic Naval Institute Press of Annapolis, Maryland.
His works The Hunt for Red October (1984), Patriot Games (1987), Clear and Present Danger (1989), and The Sum of All Fears (1991) have been turned into commercially successful films. Tom Clancy's works also inspired games such as the Ghost Recon, Rainbow Six, The Division, and Splinter Cell series. Since Clancy's death in 2013, the Jack Ryan series has been continued by his family estate through a series of authors.

Early life and education 
Clancy was born on April 12, 1947, at Franklin Square Hospital in Baltimore, Maryland, and grew up in the Northwood neighborhood in northeast Baltimore. The family was Irish-American. He was the second of three children to Thomas Clancy, who worked for the United States Postal Service, and Catherine Langan Clancy, who worked in a store's credit department. He was a member of Troop 624 of the Boy Scouts of America. Clancy's siblings are Patrick and Margaret.

Clancy's mother worked to send him to the private Catholic secondary school taught by the Jesuit religious order (Society of Jesus),  Loyola High School in Towson, Maryland, from which he graduated in 1965. He then attended the associated Loyola College (now Loyola University Maryland) in Baltimore, graduating in 1969 with a bachelor's degree in English literature. While at Loyola College, he was president of the chess club. He joined the Army Reserve Officers' Training Corps; however, he was ineligible to serve due to his myopia (nearsightedness), which required him to wear thick eyeglasses.

After graduating, Clancy worked for an insurance company in Hartford, Connecticut.

In 1973, Clancy joined the O. F. Bowen Agency, a small insurance agency based in Owings, Maryland, founded by his wife's grandfather. In 1980, he purchased the insurance agency from his wife's grandmother and wrote novels in his spare time. While working at the insurance agency, he wrote his debut novel, The Hunt for Red October (1984).

Career 
Clancy's literary career began in 1982 when he started writing The Hunt for Red October, which in 1984 he sold for publishing to the Naval Institute Press for $5,000. The publisher was impressed with the work; Deborah Grosvenor, the Naval Institute Press editor who read through the book, said later that she convinced the publisher: "I think we have a potential best seller here, and if we don't grab this thing, somebody else would." She believed Clancy had an "innate storytelling ability, and his characters had this very witty dialogue".  Clancy, who had hoped to sell 5,000 copies, ended up selling over 45,000. After publication, the book received praise from President Ronald Reagan, who called the work "the best yarn", subsequently boosting sales to 300,000 hardcover and two million paperback copies of the book, making it a national bestseller. The book was critically praised for its technical accuracy, which led to Clancy meeting several high-ranking officers in the U.S. military, as well as Steve Pieczenik, and to inspiration for recurring characters in his works.  Clancy's novels focus on the hero, most notably Jack Ryan and John Clark, both Irish Catholics like himself. He repeatedly uses the formula whereby the heroes are "highly skilled, disciplined, honest, thoroughly professional, and only lose their cool when incompetent politicians or bureaucrats get in their way. Their unambiguous triumphs over evil provide symbolic relief from the legacy of the Vietnam War."

The Cold War epic Red Storm Rising (1986) was co-written (according to Clancy in the book's foreword) with fellow military-oriented author Larry Bond. The book was published by Putnam and sold almost a million copies within its first year. Clancy became the cornerstone of a publishing list by Putnam which emphasized authors like Clancy who would produce annually. His publisher, Phyllis E. Grann, called these "repeaters."

Finances
Clancy has author status on the cover of dozens of books. Seventeen of his novels made it to the top of the New York Times best seller list. He co-authored memoirs of top generals, and produced numerous guided tours of the elite aspects of the American military. Andrew Bacevich states:

Clancy did for military pop-lit what Starbucks did for the preparation of caffeinated beverages: he launched a sprawling, massively profitable industrial enterprise that simultaneously serves and cultivates an insatiable consumer base. Whether the item consumed provides much in terms of nourishment is utterly beside the point. That it tastes yummy going down more than suffices to keep customers coming back.

By 1988, Clancy had earned $1.3 million for The Hunt for Red October and had signed a $3 million contract for his next three books. In 1992, he sold North American rights to Without Remorse for $14 million, a record for a single book. By 1997, Penguin Putnam Inc. (part of Pearson Education) paid Clancy $50 million for world rights to two new books and another $25 million to Red Storm Entertainment for a four-year book/multimedia deal. Clancy followed this up with an agreement with Penguin's Berkley Books for 24 paperbacks to tie in with the ABC television miniseries Tom Clancy's Net Force, which aired in the fall/winter of 1998. The Op-Center universe has laid the ground for the series of books written by Jeff Rovin, which was in an agreement worth $22 million, bringing the total value of the package to $97 million.

In 1993, Clancy joined a group of investors that included Peter Angelos, and bought the Baltimore Orioles from Eli Jacobs. In 1998, he reached an agreement to purchase the Minnesota Vikings, but had to abandon the deal because of a divorce settlement cost.

The first NetForce novel, titled Net Force (1999), was adapted as a 1999 TV movie starring Scott Bakula and Joanna Going. The first Op-Center novel (Tom Clancy's Op-Center published in 1995) was released to coincide with a 1995 NBC television miniseries of the same name starring Harry Hamlin and a cast of stars. Though the miniseries did not continue, the book series did, but later had little in common with the first TV miniseries other than the title and the names of the main characters.

Clancy wrote several nonfiction books about various branches of the U.S. Armed Forces (see nonfiction listing, in the bibliography article). He also branded several lines of books and video games with his name that are written by other authors, following premises or storylines generally in keeping with Clancy's works.

With the release of The Teeth of the Tiger (2003), Clancy introduced Jack Ryan's son and two nephews as main characters; those characters continued in his last four novels, Dead or Alive (2010), Locked On (2011), Threat Vector (2012), and Command Authority (2013).

In 2008, the French video game manufacturer Ubisoft purchased the use of Clancy's name for an undisclosed sum. It has been used in conjunction with video games and related products such as movies and books. Based on his interest in private spaceflight and his  investment in the launch vehicle company Rotary Rocket,
Clancy was interviewed in 2007 for the documentary film Orphans of Apollo (2008).

Political views 
A long-time proponent of conservative and Republican views, Clancy dedicated books to American conservative political figures, including Ronald Reagan. A week after the September 11 attacks, Clancy suggested on The O'Reilly Factor that American left-wing politicians were partly responsible for the failure to prevent the attacks due to their "gutting" of the Central Intelligence Agency.

On September 11, 2001, Clancy was interviewed by Judy Woodruff on CNN. During the interview, he noted that orthodox "Islam does not permit suicide." Among other observations during this interview, Clancy cited discussions he had with military experts on the lack of planning to deal with a hijacked plane being used in a suicide attack and criticized the news media's treatment of the United States Intelligence Community. Clancy appeared again on PBS's Charlie Rose, to discuss the implications of the day's events with Richard Holbrooke, New York Times journalist Judith Miller, and Senator John Edwards, among others. Clancy was interviewed on those shows because his book Debt of Honor (1994) included a scenario wherein a disgruntled Japanese airline pilot crashes a fueled Boeing 747 into the U.S. Capitol dome during an address by the President to a joint session of Congress, killing the President and most of Congress. In the book Clancy also implies that Japan's prosperity is due primarily to unequal trading terms, and portrays Japan's business leaders acting in a power hungry cabal.

Numerous scholars have examined the political dimensions of Clancy's books, especially in the context of the Cold War. Historian Walter Hixson has argued that Clancy's novels, especially The Hunt for Red October and Red Storm Rising, were "popular representations of Reagan-era Cold War values. They reflect both popular perceptions of Soviet behavior and the predominant national security values of the Reagan era. They also perpetuate myths about the U.S. past and reinforce the symbols, images, and historical lessons that have dominated Cold War discourse."

Personal life 
Clancy's first wife, Wanda Thomas King, was a nurse. They married in 1969, and had four children. The couple separated briefly in 1995, and permanently separated in December 1996. Wanda Clancy filed for divorce in November 1997, which became final in January 1999. As part of the divorce, she and Clancy split his minority stake in the Baltimore Orioles.

On June 26, 1999, Clancy married freelance journalist Alexandra Marie Llewellyn, whom he had met in 1997. Llewellyn is the daughter of J. Bruce Llewellyn and a family friend of Colin Powell, who originally introduced the couple to each other. They remained together until Clancy's death in October 2013. The two had one daughter.

Clancy was a Roman Catholic. The plot of his novel Red Rabbit revolves around John Paul II.  In a June 27, 1993 interview with The Washington Post, he was quoted as saying, "I've had [sex scenes] in my books before, but you had to look real fast because, you know, I'm a married Catholic and I don't do that."  In a 2002 interview with Lev Grossman for Time magazine, Clancy lamented what he perceived as society's double standard in the way Catholics are viewed by some people in society in relation to other demographic segments: "You can't hate black people any more, of course, and you can't hate homosexuals any more, but you can hate all the Catholics you want."

Property 
Clancy's 80-acre estate, which was once a summer camp, is located in Calvert County, Maryland. It has a panoramic view of the Chesapeake Bay. The stone mansion, which cost $2 million, has 24 rooms and features a shooting range in the basement. The property also features a World War II-era M4 Sherman tank, a Christmas gift from his first wife.

Clancy also purchased a 17,000 square foot penthouse condominium in the Ritz-Carlton, in Baltimore's Inner Harbor, for $16 million. Clancy and his wife combined four units to create the apartment.

His Chesapeake Bay estate sold for $4.9 million in 2020.

Death 
Clancy died of heart failure on October 1, 2013, at Johns Hopkins Hospital, near his Baltimore home. John D. Gresham, a co-author and researcher with Clancy on several books, said Clancy had been suffering heart problems for some time prior: "Five or six years ago Tom suffered a heart attack and he went through bypass surgery. It wasn't that he had another heart attack, his heart just wore out."

The Chicago Tribune quoted Pulitzer Prize-winning film critic and author Stephen Hunter as saying, "When he published The Hunt for Red October, he redefined and expanded the genre, and as a consequence of that, many people were able to publish such books who had previously been unable to do so."

On March 31, 2014, the Orioles honored Clancy with a video tribute during their home opener, and the team wore a tribute patch on their jerseys through the season.

Achievements and awards 
 Clancy was one of only three authors to sell two million copies on a first printing in the 1990s (the others were John Grisham and J. K. Rowling). Clancy's novel Clear and Present Danger (1989) sold 1,625,544 hardcover copies, making it the #1 bestselling novel of the 1980s.
 Clancy received the Golden Plate Award of the American Academy of Achievement in 1988. Clancy was the Host of the 1995 Achievement Summit in Colonial Williamsburg and the 1997 Achievement Summit in Baltimore.
 Clancy received an honorary doctorate in humane letters and delivered the commencement address at Rensselaer Polytechnic Institute in 1992, and had since worked a reference to the school into many of his main works.
 Clancy was an honorary Yeoman Warder of the Tower of London and received the title "Supernumerary Yeoman"; he had been arrested for scaling the walls in his younger years.
 Clancy received the Alfred Thayer Mahan Award for Literary Achievement from the Navy League of the United States in 1990.

Works

Film, TV and video game adaptations

Films

Short films

 Ghost Recon: Alpha
 Ghost Recon Wildlands: War Within the Cartel

Television series

Video games 

Officially licensed games based on The Hunt for Red October and Red Storm Rising were released in the late 1980s and early 1990s for various 8-bit home computers such as the Commodore 64 and ZX Spectrum. Those included a submarine combat simulation (based on the book) and an action game (based on the film).

More recently, Ubisoft has made many video game series based on Tom Clancy's books or were endorsed by Clancy with his name on the series.

References

Further reading
  Baiocco, Richard ed. Readings on Tom Clancy (2003), a guide to Clancy
 Greenberg, Martin. H. The Tom Clancy Companion (1992) excerpt; also online free to borrow
 Keene, Ann T. "Clancy, Tom (12 April 1947–01 October 2013)" American National Biography (2015) online

Scholarly studies
 Blouin, Michael J. Mass-Market Fiction and the Crisis of American Liberalism, 1972–2017 (Palgrave Macmillan, 2018), Chapter 5: "Tom Clancy and the Liberal Family Tree" pp. 147–175. argues that liberal critics misinterpret his "conservatism" excerpt
 Gallagher, Mark. Action figures: Men, action films, and contemporary adventure narratives (Springer, 2006).
 Garson, Helen S. Tom Clancy: A critical companion (1996) online free to borrow
 Griffin, Benjamin. "The good guys win: Ronald Reagan, Tom Clancy, and the transformation of national security" (MA thesis, U of Texas, 2015). online
 Hicks, Heather J. "“Sleeping Beauty”: Corporate Culture, Race, and Reality in Michael Crichton's Rising Sun and Tom Clancy's Debt of Honor." in Hicks, The Culture of Soft Work (Palgrave Macmillan, 2009) pp. 139-163. excerpt
 Hixson, Walter L. "Red Storm Rising: Tom Clancy Novels and the Cult of National Security." Diplomatic History 17.4 (1993): 599-614. online
 Outlaw, Leroy B. "Red Storm Rising-A Primer for a Future Conventional War in Central Europe"" (Army War College, 1988). online
 Payne, Matthew Thomas. Playing war: Military video games after 9/11 (NYU Press, 2016).
 Terdoslavich, William. The Jack Ryan Agenda: Policy and Politics in the Novels of Tom Clancy: An Unauthorized Analysis (Macmillan, 2005). excerpt

External links 

 
 
 

 
1947 births
2013 deaths
20th-century American novelists
21st-century American novelists
American male novelists
American military writers
American people of Irish descent
American spy fiction writers
American thriller writers
Baltimore Orioles owners
Loyola University Maryland alumni
Maryland Republicans
People from Calvert County, Maryland
People from Towson, Maryland
Writers from Baltimore
Roman Catholic writers
Techno-thriller writers
Novelists from Maryland
21st-century American non-fiction writers
American male non-fiction writers
Catholics from Maryland
Loyola Blakefield alumni
20th-century American male writers
21st-century American male writers
Reagan Era